Aura Di Nasio (born 14 December 1959) is a Venezuelan diver. She competed in the women's 3 metre springboard event at the 1976 Summer Olympics.

References

External links
 

1959 births
Living people
Venezuelan female divers
Olympic divers of Venezuela
Divers at the 1976 Summer Olympics
Place of birth missing (living people)
20th-century Venezuelan women